Psectra diptera is a species of brown lacewing in the family Hemerobiidae. It is found in Europe and Northern Asia (excluding China) and North America.

References

Further reading

External links

 

Hemerobiiformia
Articles created by Qbugbot
Insects described in 1839